Aren't You Glad You're You? is an album made by the cast of Sesame Street in 1977.

Track listing

References 

Sesame Street albums
1977 albums